Dipsas chaparensis is a non-venomous snake found in Bolivia.

References

Dipsas
Snakes of South America
Endemic fauna of Bolivia
Reptiles of Bolivia
Reptiles described in 1992